is a Japanese manga series, written and illustrated by Tatsuhiko Hikagi. KADOKAWA began releasing the digital English volumes on BookWalker on December 10, 2014. An anime television series adaptation by Studio Gokumi premiered on Tokyo MX and other networks on April 4, 2013.

Plot
Kiri Haimura is a seemingly ordinary boy with one slight problem: he is obsessed with cutting other people's hair. One day, he meets Iwai Mushanokōji, the  who cannot cut her hair because of an inherited curse. Kiri finds out that his scissors, "The Severing Crime Edge" is the only thing that can cut them. The scissors were a killing tool that belonged to his ancestor, Norma Grayland, the most infamous serial killer in history. It is said whoever assassinates the Hair Queen will have a wish granted. Can Kiri protect Iwai from the Killing Goods Owners, known as 'Authors', associates of the illegitimate Gossip organization? Let the game begin!

Characters

Kiri is the current owner and Author of the Killing Good, "The Cutting and Severing Crime Edge", a pair of scissors. Subsequently, he is usually annoyed by his neighborhood since childhood because of his habit of cutting hair. After Kiri meets Iwai by accident, he becomes fascinated with her beautiful hair, becoming friends with her after realizing that her hair can only be cut by his scissors. Upon learning that Iwai is targeted by other Authors, he vows to protect her, making use of the enhanced reflexes he gains when fighting with his scissors. Iwai acts as an "Instead" to Kiri, with the act of cutting her hair every day relieving him from the homicidal tendencies that usually befall an Author when possessed by a Killing Good. Should Iwai die, the loss of his Instead would eventually have him overcome with this desire, turning him into a murderer. He later unlocks the true power of the "Crime Edge", using the ability of pain augmentation, causing excruciating pain on whoever he hurts with them, creating hallucinations of their body being severed. Kiri contracts Grayland for self-control power and follows Zewulfa's delusion to collect hair to lift the curse and rescue Iwai. Zewulfa's manifestation summons a guillotine and all past Author against Violet and Iwai, however, Kiri gathers the courage to use his non-killing tool to execute Zewulfa, marking her Kiri's first and last victim. With the curse gone, the Crime Edge is put away as a memento of Kiri and Iwai's curse adventures.

The truth is Grayland received the scissors from a blacksmith who later suffered an unknown plague. Grayland desperately search a cure for the pandemic in every village claiming himself amateur doctor. However, the villagers soon suspected Grayland and caught him dissecting flesh corpses for autopsies, considered an act of vandalism and cast him away. Regardless of the mistrust, Grayland continued his research carrying the scissors, his only tool, which eventually driven him irate cursing the scissors, labeling him the most notorious murderer. His remaining colleagues developed the remedy for the disease that was unveil a type of moss and created modern antibiotics.

The main heroine and the current "Hair Queen". With a long black hair that goes down all the way to her feet that can't be cut or damaged with ordinary tools, she is a reclusive person unable to leave her home until meeting Kiri. Thanks to Kiri being able to cut her hair, she finally manages to go to school and talk normally with others. However, every day at midnight, her hair grows back to the original size, thus Kiri must cut it every day, which is not a nuisance to him at all as he never gets bored of doing it. Iwai is very kind to where she's willingly forgive those that harmed her. According to legend, the original Hair Queen, left a curse to her descendants - including Iwai - which gives them uncuttable hair, and she is the origin of the Killing Goods. It is said that as the Hair Queen, she can only be harmed with Killing Goods, explaining why Iwai's hair can be cut with the "Crime Edge" and whoever manages to kill her can have a wish granted, even if it means destroying the world's natural laws, thus she is usually targeted by other Authors. Iwai and Kiri develop a romantic relationship, and become a couple.

As Violet rubs a saint coin that awakens Zewulfa's spirit in Iwai's body; she obliges to her guilt of injustice. Long ago, Zewulfa unintentionally defiled a fortuneteller's beauty hair (Violet's ancestor) becoming obsessed in gaining knowledge and status through the work of mercenaries and assassins; creating the rules of using other people "Insteads" to relief the pity of losing loved ones, and cursing the Queen's descendants in a cycle of wish-granting out of death. However, Kiri exposes Zewulfa had been deceiving Iwai, and Zewulfa was really a malicious Queen who took extreme pride of her silky black hair, going to lengths in stealing other corpses' black hair, refusing to share to anybody even her own descendants. In the last chapters, Iwai did serious thinking on how to rid the remnants of Zewulfa in her dreams due not wanting lose her uncuttable hair afraid that Kiri might leave her. Reaching the decision, Kiri lends Iwai his Crime Edge and slices Zewulfa for good. Living with normal hair, Kiri keeps his vow to stay by Iwai's side forever and kisses her.

The younger sister of Houko Byouinzaka and Author of the Killing Good called "The Injection of Eternal Sleep" a syringe that can kill people either by being injected or being nicked. The original owner of her Killing Good was a medical professional, Florence Nightingale, who is known to have infected people with her poisonous vaccinations. Yamane goes to the same school and class as Kiri. She's often very unpredictable and constantly on edge when her lust for blood is not satisfied, which is why she is very much dependant on Houko. Yamane's first victims were her parents, a crime for which Houko took the blame so as to keep Yamane from being incriminated. Yamane gradually warms up to her classmates thanks to Iwai's efforts. Afraid of Houko abandoning her if the curse was lifted, Houko confirms her unwavering support for Yamane.

The elder sister of Yamane Byouinzaka and the professor's assistant, she's initially cold and heartless towards Iwai, but eventually treats her kindly. Houko allowed herself to be Yamane's "Instead" as a way to relieve her from the blood lust due to the pressure of Killing Goods that she possesses by allowing Yamane to inject her with a saline solution as a way to act out the latter's murderous intent. It is hinted that she has gotten so used to it, that she develops a kind of masochistic arousal. After the custom-made Authors' defeat, Houko now shares Nightingale with Yamane. Yamane implies Houko secretly has feelings for Kanae.

He is a college professor that observes the Gossip organization, and is Iwai's legal guardian. He is also the Byouinzaka sisters' foster parent, mainly out of self-interest. Houko describes him a Lolicon. Kanae mutters that Kiri will suffer a fate similar to his past. Revealing Kanae once had a girl in his childhood stumble upon a dress "the Cocktail Dress of Gorgeous Seduction" originally owned by an aristocratic woman who after dancing with men out of self-interest and later kidnaps to "saddle" them in overwhelming seduction till their hearts passes out, and she developed the urge to intercourse Kanae every night as an "Instead", until by early teens he resisted her for saying unpleasant things then the girl committed suicide. Since then, Kanae reflected his guilt and observe children for their safety.

A professional foreign killer and the adopted daughter of Iwai's father, making her Iwai's little sister. Her Killing Goods is "The Opener of Bloody Dissection", a collections of knives that inflicts the wounded victims with endless bleeding unless treated with a special cure. Originally made into a Killing Goods owner by Iwai's father so that Iwai's hair can be cut. Following his death, Emily's intention changed to killing Iwai so she could wish for her father's revival, mostly out of jealousy of Iwai. However, after experiencing excruciating pain and defeat from Kiri's Crime Edge, she bonds with Iwai. Emily appears to be acquaintances with Violet until she learns her ordeals. Emily is revealed to be rather excited in sexual affairs. She is one of the only three successful "custom-made" Killing Goods owners: Owners who are not descendants of the original users of the Killing Goods they own.

Schoolmates

Kashiko's family runs a beauty salon and determines she should take over the family business eventually, but Kashiko aspires to be an attractive model instead. It seems she harbors romantic feelings for Kiri, even letting him cut her hair when Iwai isn't around. However, Kashiko comes to realization that Kiri cannot love her as much as Iwai. Asking her to gradually let him cut her hair to restore the rusty Crime Edge, since it can only be done from someone who takes pride in her hair.

He's an ace member of the Iaido club, and a friend of Kiri.

She enjoys horror stories, and seems to be fond of the Norma Grayland's history. She is neighbors and childhood friends with Kotarō and harbors feelings for him.

Authors and Insteads

She is the vice president of the student council and is the owner of the Killing Good "Pet Whip of Submissive Butchery" a whip that manipulates people with a few slaps from it into submissive zombies. She despises popularity because people only see her attractive instead of her well-being. It said the whip belonged to her ancestor, Fujin Shihōdō, headmaster of the Kazoku, in the Meiji era, who used it for stealing other people's will and imprisoning them until they die of starvation. Ruka desires true domination; Romio whom she worshiped since childhood.

He is the president of the student council and acts as an "Instead" for Ruka. Willing to endure the constant slaps of Ruka's whip that she inflicts on Romio. Since childhood he adores her as a princess, leaving many girls around jealous of Ruka for having Romio. He and Ruka are often charged with cases involving Gossip.

He is the owner of the Killing Good "The Rulebook of Sentencing and Execution" and enjoys killing various other Authors who go after the Hair Queen. It said his book belonged to a judge, Garivaldi, who executed twenty people by his own hands. By reciting the various crimes of target, he can summon a rope and hang the target. If the target is not evil, or guilty enough of these crimes, then the rope shall snap leaving the target knocked out. Kozakura is always interfering with Seigi's perverted actions of justice. He is killed by Emily and Violet after intervening a Gossip party to execute Kiri.

She is an employee at a particular food bar that Iwai's father usually went to. In the bar, Karuko owns a white piano which she plays it frequently but some customers can notice that she stops halfway, claiming it is to encourage more customers to come and listen. In reality, however, the real reason why she doesn't because her piano is actually the Killing Good "Pianissimo of Ecstatic Symphony", which kills people after listening to the final note. Due to her blindness, Karuko has Koizumi direct her walking. She and Koizumi don't wish to participate in the murder game.

He is Karuko's co-worker and acts as a tuner to her piano. He serves as an "Instead" for Karuko thanks to his deafness, which is why her Killing Good leaves him unaffected. Kiri sees Koizumi and Karuko's relationship similar to him and Iwai.

An optimistic Author who works as an aid for Violet. He is one of the only three successful "custom-made" Killing Goods owners. His Killing Good is "The Rapidshot of Pinpoint Penetration" a rifle that fires endless long range bullets with instant hits thoroughly. His hobby is stuffed animal collecting, and is sensitive to pain. He is defeated by Kiri and arrested.

Fritz Maillold
A middle-aged Author who's involved with Gossip. He is one of the only three successful "custom-made" Killing Goods owners. He produces an irregular toxic incense "Cantarella of the Concealed Murder" that spreads rapidly than Yamane's Killing Good, but can resist it longer. His first attempt was to remove Kanae, and then Houko indicts Injection to fight back for her own responsibility (after a misconduct with Kanae) and lethal stabbed Fritz through the mouth to death.

Ewer Sullivan
Violet's personal attendant. She wields the "Clock of Instructional Admonition" a pocket watch that momentary shifts the timing of the body's biological activity, meaning minimal damages can deliberately resort to major ones, and the opposite also functional. The killing watch originally belonged to an abusive tutor. Ewer and Helen engage Emily and Yamane until Kiri interjects and consent a deal.    
 
Helen Viniar
Violet's personal attendant. She wields "The Gauntlet of Pummeling Strikes" a pair of killing gloves that amplify the flow of blood circulation, including change the balance in the hormone allowing counter attacks skyrocket. Her original was a short-temper wealthy horse rider. Helen and Ewer both act as unfriendly Author and Instead team.

The Man with the Hammer

An unnamed Author who using "The Sledgehammer of Crushing Disintegration" a huge hammer that smashes walls and makes things brittle. He doesn't have an "Instead" to relieve him, so he's engulfed by the impulses of his killing tool and kills without a purpose. The man apparently broke out of his cell, and eventually reaches Iwai's house and battles Kiri. After Kiri defeats him, the man is hung by Seigi for his crimes.

Other characters

 
The golden haired mistress of the Gossip organization. Has information on all "Killing Goods", and she might hold a personal grudge against the Hair Queen. She stole Kiri's first kiss. She had Iwai's father put to death, whose last words were begging Violet to spare Iwai till she finds a lover: Kiri. Violet is capable of unconditionally using all Killing Goods and purchasing tools imbedded with the effects for her own gear. Her only desire is Zewulfa herself. Violet's ancestor receive a saint coin from Zewulfa in a controversial game whether she should end Zewulfa's reign or leave the wish cycle for profit. During a final confrontation, Seigi's spirit rebukes that Violet and her family have always been cowards. Violet apologises to everyone remarking her aggressive actions was a certain way to resolve the curse and her devotion towards Iwai.

 

A female police officer, who is often in charge of cases involving Seigi since he judges other Authors before having them brought to court, and she used or fond of getting herself hanged by his Killing Good rope, or falling unconscious. She sort of acts as an "Instead" for him but claims he doesn't care. Upon Seigi's death, it is revealed that she loved him.

Kiri's sister. She is hasty and stubborn. Kiri says that Hari was one of those who label him as a "creep" to their neighborhood because of his habit of cutting hair. During childhood, Hari liked Kiri for cutting her hair, but claims she now hates it. Iwai can tell she still enjoy having her hair cut, so she has Kiri set up a special salon for Hari. When Kiri's abnormal urge to kill takes effect and unable to resist cutting her hair, Hari becomes caught up in the situation and learns about the cursed Killing Goods. Despite being powerless, she wants to welcome her brother and Iwai home in any way she can.

Media

Manga

Anime
The anime television series adaptation is directed by Yūji Yamaguchi and produced by Studio Gokumi with music by Yasuharu Takanashi. It started airing on Tokyo MX on April 4, 2013. It was streamed by Crunchyroll with subtitles in English. Sentai Filmworks licensed the series for home video release in North America.

Reception
Carl Kimlinger of Anime News Network published a positive review covering the first half of the anime series. While expressing criticism towards its "messy" transitions into different genres, Kimlinger praised it for its direction in atmosphere and action, funny humor and viewing the perverse Author/Instead relationships in a "redemptive" light. Kimlinger wrote that the subject matter of the first half will not be to everyone's liking. Richard Eisenbeis of Kotaku talked about the complete anime series, expressing interest in the world and its cast of diverse characters but felt that it was bogged down by its constant genre jumping and unsatisfying ending. Aiden Foote, writing for THEM Anime Reviews, gave praise to the show's two main leads and supporting cast for their quirks and aesthetics being "interesting and varied" but found it overall to be "a limp Future Diary clone" with poor pacing and an unfinished plot. While not giving it a recommendation, Foote said that: "It remains perfectly watchable - don't get me wrong - but never anything more than that."

References

External links
  at Media Factory
 
 

2009 manga
2013 anime television series debuts
Anime series based on manga
Media Factory manga
Kadokawa Dwango franchises
Seinen manga
Sentai Filmworks
Studio Gokumi